Kristin Marion Demann (born 7 April 1993) is a German football defender, currently playing for VfL Wolfsburg.

Club career
In May 2022, Demann signed to join VfL Wolfsburg.

International career
She was a member of the German Under-19 national team that won the 2011 U-19 European Championship.

Career statistics

International

International goal
Scores and results list Germany's goal tally first:

Honours

Club
1. FFC Turbine Potsdam
Bundesliga: Winner 2010–11, 2011–12

Bayern Munich
Frauen-Bundesliga: Winner 2020-21

International
UEFA Women's Under-19 Championship: Winner 2011

References

External links

1993 births
Living people
German women's footballers
People from Gehrden
Women's association football defenders
1. FFC Turbine Potsdam players
Germany women's international footballers
FC Bayern Munich (women) players
2. Frauen-Bundesliga players
Frauen-Bundesliga players
TSG 1899 Hoffenheim (women) players
Footballers from Lower Saxony
1. FC Köln (women) players
VfL Wolfsburg (women) players
UEFA Women's Euro 2017 players